Barry Reid was a politician.

Barry Reid may also refer to:
People
Barry Reid, author, e.g. of the book The Paper Trip, mentioned in Unsolved Mysteries, season 3 
Barry Reid, coach of New South Wales Waratahs (field hockey)

Fictional entities
Barry Reid, Scrubs character, brother of Elliot Reid

See also
Barry Reed (disambiguation)